Isorophida (the isorophids) is an extinct order of prehistoric echinoderms in the class Edrioasteroidea.

References 

 Isorophida at fossilworks

Edrioasteroidea
Prehistoric animal orders
Echinoderm orders